Karl-Einar Jensen (born 16 June 1965) is a Norwegian sailor. He competed in the men's 470 event at the 1988 Summer Olympics.

References

External links
 

1965 births
Living people
Norwegian male sailors (sport)
Olympic sailors of Norway
Sailors at the 1988 Summer Olympics – 470
Sportspeople from Oslo